Virgin and Child or Madonna and Child or Mary and Child usually refers to artistic depictions of Mary and Child Jesus together, as part of both Catholic and Orthodox church traditions, and very notably in the Marian art in the Catholic Church. The various different names are effectively interchangeable, and any particular work may be given different titles by different sources.

Particular types

Nursing Madonna (Maria/Madonna Lactans)
Seat of Wisdom, enthroned Virgin with Child, especially in Romanesque art
Hodegetria, one of the most important of the many types of Eastern Orthodox icons of the Virgin and Child 
Black Madonna

List of works
Images of the Virgin and Child were for centuries the most common subject for Christian religious art. There are many thousands of surviving historical images. The following is a list (probably incomplete) of those with articles, listed by their usual type of title (although other title forms may be found).

Virgin and Child
The Virgin and Child (The Northbrook Madonna)
Virgin and Child (Filocamo, Palermo) by Antonio Filocamo
Enthroned Virgin and Child (English, The Cloisters), a statuette
Virgin and Child (after van der Goes?) by  Hugo van der Goes or Gerard David
Virgin and Child (Rubens)
Virgin and Child Enthroned (van der Weyden) 
Virgin and Child from the Sainte-Chapelle, an ivory sculpture
The Virgin and Child Surrounded by the Holy Innocents by Peter Paul Rubens
Virgin and Child with Canon van der Paele
Virgin and Child with a Cat by Rembrandt van Rijn
Virgin and Child with an Angel (Botticelli, Florence)
Virgin and Child with an Angel (Botticelli, Boston) also known as Our Lady of the Eucharist by Sandro Botticelli 
Virgin and Child with Four Angels by Gerard David
Virgin and Child with Four Angels (Donatello), a bronze roundel by Donatello
The Virgin and Child with Four Holy Virgins by Master of the Virgo inter Virgines
Virgin and Child with the Infant St. John the Baptist (Botticelli)
Virgin and Child with a Rosary by Artemisia Gentileschi
Virgin and Child with Saint Anne, a subject in Christian art showing Saint Anne with her daughter, the Virgin Mary, and her grandson Jesus
The Virgin and Child with St. Anne (Leonardo) by Leonardo da Vinci
The Virgin and Child with St. Anne (van Steffeswert), also known in Dutch as The Virgin and Child with St. Anne (van Steffeswert), work by Jan van Steffeswert 
The Virgin and Child with St Anne and St John the Baptist by Leonardo da Vinci
Virgin and Child with Saint Anne (Masaccio)
Virgin and Child with Saints (van der Weyden)
Virgin and Child with Saints Barbara and Catherine by Quentin Matsys
The Virgin and Child with Two Angels (Andrea del Verrochio)

Madonna and Child

Enthroned Madonna and Child with Saints by Agnolo Gaddi
Enthroned Madonna and Child (Filippo Lippi)
Madonna and Child Enthroned with Saints (Raphael) by Raphael
Madonna and Child (Artemisia Gentileschi)
Madonna and Child (Botticelli, Avignon) by Sandro Botticelli
Madonna and Child (Duccio) by Duccio di Buoninsegna
Madonna and Child (Lippi) by Filippo Lippi
Madonna and Child (Masaccio) by Masaccio
Madonna and Child (van Dyck) by Anthony van Dyck
Madonna with Child between Sts. Flavian and Onuphrius by Lorenzo Lotto
Madonna and Child Kissing by Quentin Matsys
Madonna and Child Playing with the Veil by Jan Gossaert
Madonna and Child with the Book by Raphael
Madonna with Child Enthroned between Saints John the Baptist and Sebastian by Pietro Perugino
The Madonna and Child with the Infant St. John the Baptist (Leonardo da Vinci) by Leonardo da Vinci
Madonna with Child with Young John the Baptist (Cranach) by Lucas Cranach the Elder
Madonna and Child with St. Anne (Dei Palafrenieri) by Caravaggio
Madonna and Child with Saint John and the Angels, also known as Manchester Madonna, an unfinished painting attributed to Michelangelo
Madonna and Child with Saints Michael the Archangel and Andrea by Cima da Conegliano
Madonna and Child with saints polyptych (Duccio), a five piece Madonna polyptych by Duccio di Buoninsegna 
Madonna and Child with Saints (Signorelli, Arezzo) by Luca Signorelli
Madonna and Child with Saints Luke and Catherine of Alexandria by Titian
Madonna and Child with St. John the Baptist and St. Mary Magdalene by Neroccio di Bartolomeo de' Landi 
Madonna and Child and Two Angels (Botticelli) by Filippo Lippi
Madonna with Child (Crivelli) by Carlo Crivelli
Madonna with Child and Saints (Pontormo) by Jacopo Pontormo
Madonna with Child and six Angels (Duccio) by Duccio di Buoninsegna
Madonna and Child with Two Donors (van Dyck) by Anthony van Dyck
Madonna with Writing Child by Pinturicchio
Madonna with Writing Child and Bishop by Pinturicchio
Madonna with Writing Child and St. Jerome by Pinturicchio
Madonna Adoring the Child with Five Angels (Botticelli) by Botticelli

Madonna of
Madonna of Jan Vos also known as Virgin and Child, with Saints and Donor by Jan van Eyck
La Madonna de Bogota (Raphael) attributed to Raphael
Madonna of Bruges by marble sculpture by Michelangelo
Madonna of the Carnation also known as Madonna with Vase or Madonna with Child, by Leonardo da Vinci 
Madonna of the Harpies by Andrea del Sarto
Madonna of Humility (Gentile da Fabriano)
Madonna of Humility (Fra Angelico)
Madonna of Loreto (Raphael)
Madonna of the Pinks by Raphael
Madonna of the Quail attributed to Pisanello
Madonna of the Red Cherubims by  Giovanni Bellini
Madonna of the Rose Garden attributed to Michelino da Besozzo or Stefano da Verona
Madonna of Roudnice
Madonna of the Rose (Raphael) by Raphael
Madonna of the Rose Bower by Stefan Lochner
Madonna of the Small Trees by Giovanni Bellini
Madonna of the Stairs a relief sculpture by Michelangelo
Madonna of Veveri
Madonna del Bordone by Coppo di Marcovaldo
Madonna del Padiglione (Botticelli) also known as Madonna and Child with Three Angels by Sandro Botticelli
Madonna del Prato (Bellini)
Madonna del Prato (Raphael)
Madonna della seggiola by Raphael
Madonna Della Strada
Madonna of the Yarnwinder, series of works attributed to Leonardo da Vinci and another artist
Madonna Litta attributed to Leonardo da Vinci

Place or owner name first
Aldobrandini Madonna by Titian
Alzano Madonna or Madonna with Child, by Giovanni Bellini
Diptych of Philip de Croÿ with The Virgin and Child a pair of paintings by Rogier van der Weyden
Garvagh Madonna by Raphael
Ince Hall Madonna, also known as Virgin and Child Reading by Jan van Eyck
Lucca Madonna (van Eyck) by Jan van Eyck

See also
"This Endris Night" also known as "The Virgin and Child", a 15th-century English Christmas carol

Virgin Mary in art
Nativity of Jesus in art